FIBA AfroBasket 2021 was the 30th edition of the FIBA AfroBasket, a men's basketball continental championship of Africa. The tournament was hosted by Rwanda for the first time. It was originally scheduled to take place between 17 and 29 August 2021, but it was moved back a week due to the COVID-19 pandemic, to 24 August to 5 September 2021.

The tournament featured 16 teams, with South Sudan debuting at the AfroBasket stage. Tunisia was the defending champion, having won the 2017 tournament and they defended their title with a final win over Ivory Coast, while Senegal won the bronze medal.

Host selection
In June 2019, FIBA Africa announced that Rwanda hosts the 2021 FIBA AfroBasket outbesting the bids of Senegal, Ivory Coast, and DR Congo.

Venue
The entire tournament was hosted at the Kigali Arena, which was opened in August 2019. It is also the biggest indoor arena in East Africa.

Qualification

The qualification started in 2020, with nine teams participating in the pre-qualifiers, including the four eliminated teams from the 2019 World Cup African Qualifiers. The hosts Rwanda qualiied directly to the AfroBasket 2021.

Qualified teams

Draw
The draw was held on 28 May 2021.

Squads

Each team consisted of 12 players.

Preliminary round
The schedule was released on 8 June 2021.

All times are local (UTC+2).

Group A

Group B

Group C

Group D

Knockout stage

Bracket

Qualification to quarterfinals

Quarterfinals

Semifinals

Third place game

Final

Final standings

Source:

Statistics and awards

Statistical leaders

Players

Points

Rebounds

Assists

Blocks

Steals

Efficiency

Teams

Points

Rebounds

Assists

Blocks

Steals

Efficiency

Awards
The awards were announced on 5 September 2021.

See also
2021 Women's Afrobasket

References

External links
Official website
Tournament summary

 
2021
2021 in African basketball
2021 in Rwandan sport
International basketball competitions hosted by Rwanda
Sport in Kigali
Basketball events postponed due to the COVID-19 pandemic
August 2021 sports events in Africa
September 2021 sports events in Africa